Natta Company is a folk theatre troupe from Bengal established in 1869.

Corporate history 
In 1869, Baikuntha Natta inspired by his younger brother, Srinath Natta, came up with his venture in the entertainment industry. He named his group "Machrang Baikuntha Sangeet Samaj". The local people used to call the group – "Natta-der Dal" (translated Natta's group). As time passed by the name "Natta Company" became a well known name in Bengal’s folk theatre and then in stage theatre. In the early years the group used to perform in different Zamindar’s (landlord’s) palaces. As time passed on they started to perform in different villages, small towns and also in cities like Kolkata (Calcutta). The responsibilities came in the hands of Baikuntha Natta’s descendants – Mathuranath Natta and then Jagendranath and Radhendranath Natta. Natta Company is being managed by Sri Makhan Lal Natta, a man in his late 70s.

In the early 1950s, Natta Company started to use handbills for publicity. From the mid-1950s they started to publish their advertisements in the local magazines. As they moved to cities, they started to use the print media effectively for advertisements and promotion. They published their advertisements in different newspapers like – Jugantar, Ananda Bazar Patrika, Dainik Bosumoti, Swadhinata etc. In the early-1970s Natta Company became very popular in Bengal and Eastern Regions of India.

Corporate evolution 
Natta Company started its journey in the nineteenth century in Bangladesh. It started from villages of Barisal known as Machrang and Pangiputhipara. At that time jatras, were based on stories, written on religious, mythological and historical plots. Different parts of epics like the Ramayana and the Mahabharata were also performed. They performed in temple courtyards, narrating the events of their patron god's life, and expressed their devotion with frenzied acting.  The collective singing amidst the clang of gongs and fumes produced a mass hypnosis and sent these singers into an acting trance.

Natta Company became more popular for its musical presentations and their colorful and glittering outfits, which were the main attractions for the poor and illiterate rural audience. Moreover, as they were vastly familiar with the various religious and mythological stories, so the themes of palas were predominantly based on them. It stated venturing out to nearby towns and gradually to the cities like Dhaka, Barishal, Jashor, Khulna etc. The influence of regional variations in culture and language also enriched the contents of their palas.

Socio-political environment always had a prominent effect on jatras. The influence of society helped the audience to relate themselves and their environment with the jatra. As political consciousness grew in pre-independence India, jatra writers started exploring the social and political scenario related to Indian freedom movement to find new ideas for their palas.  Mythological stories, fights between good and evil, symbolised the Indian masses and the British.  The Devil was dressed in the tight trousers and black jacket of the nineteenth century, and the Noble Prince wore the Indian dhoti. "Swadeshi Jatra", written by Mukunda Das, came when India and Bengal were going through a turbulent time. Natta Company, in their jatras, never confronted or criticised the political system directly. For this reason, at the times of swadeshi movement when the British were closing down different jatra group or banning different stage theatres and jatras, Natta Company was not affected.

After the ‘Great Bengal Famine' of 1943, Natta Company performed the jatra pala – "Akaler Desh" which became very popular with the masses. In 1948, they made "Parashmani" to highlight the importance of educating women. In the 1960s, "Plaban" was made to focus on the different facets of the Zamindari system. The golden period of Natta Co. started from late-1960s and continued until the 1970s when they produced quite a few popular palas.

Some of the other prominent palas from the Natta Co. were ‘Karunasindhu Vidyasagar', ‘Patiter Bhagaban'. But all throughout, they were always focused on quality offering and entertaining the common people. Monetary gains were never an important issue for them. Natta company's objective was not to earn money rather it was the a social responsibilities to educated the rural people and it was to entertain and to inform the general mass about the social scenario".

The Juri system, which utilized surrogate singers for otherwise talented actors, continued till the first decade of the present century.  By the second decade people were tired of the Juri because it continued for hours, spinning fine melodic gossamers that suspended the theatrical enjoyment.  It had become a sort of an exercise in classical singing out of proportion to the drama.  The public would taunt if the singers over did their long musical performance.  Slowly it went into disrepute. Natta Company used actors who could sing very well. There was no concept of playback singing but in some cases chorus was used. Traditionally, all roles have been played by male actors.  Some played young heroes, some vicious villains, some comic fools, some the Vivek (Conscience) and some specialise in female roles.

Until the 1970s there was no actress in Natta Company. Male actors used to play the female character. Most actors add the suffix Rani (graceful lady) to their name to distinguish themselves as female artist. In ‘Patiter Bhagaban' Phani Bhattacharya, who plays the Queen Mother and Hari Gopal Das became famous as the best emotional "actress." In the role of ‘Debi', wife of the cobbler saint in ‘Petiter Bhagwan'.  He had twenty years of experience behind his feminine grace and wifely pathos.  But, with the passing time, tastes change.  To satisfy the changing taste of the audience Natta Company appointed actresses.

Instruments like Harmonium, Cornet, Clarinet, Violin, Tabla, Dholak, etc. were played by experienced musicians, which enchanted the audience. In the beginning, Natta Company appointed writers who would write the prose, script, poems, songs and dialogs. Afterward with the increasing number of jatra troops, competition from different other players of the entertainment industry and due to the changing scenario writers were not appointed. Freelance writers and professional writers started to write for Natta Company on mutual contract. Natta Company always made it sure that the story is not copied from anyone or anywhere and it should be original.

After the partition of India, Natta Company shifted permanently to Kolkata (Calcutta). Natta Company was already popular in Kolkata, so it was not very difficult to establish its popularity. In Kolkata, Natta Company started to perform in different theatres like – Star Theatre, Mahajati Sadan, Rang Mahal, Bidyamandir, Minarva etc. Renowned actors of Bengali film industry and stage-theatre worked with Natta Company and Makhan Lal Natta was a well known name in the Industry.

As time moved on television, VCRs and VCPs came in. Increasing number of television channels and movie theatres were stealing away the popularity of jatra. Even in Calcutta where it was fast losing its ground, it cropped up in night in various squares and alleys.  There is hardly a Bengali who in his childhood has not sat for hours watching the colorful jatra. Today a jatra pala, lasting four hours, consists of action-packed dialogue with only six to eight songs.  Still it retains its musical character.  People wait for the songs, which in their popularity compete with those from films.  Among the people the form retains its name, "jatragan", which means "musical jatra."  When a Bengali goes to see a performance he says that he is going to "listen to" a jatra. Natta Company also focused on the rural sector of Bengal. They were mainly focused towards the audience of Purulia, Midnapur, Bankura. They also started to perform in various cities and towns of Assam, Tripura and part of Bihar.

Inside story 
Natta Company consists of 70 to 75 people. The number of people varies on the requirement of the jatra. They open their season in September and perform nightly until the monsoon breaks in June.  All the troupes are then disbanded, and the actors are free to join any company.  The manager - the only person on permanent staff - spends the rest of his time clearing the accounts and sourcing good actors with offers for the next season.  Each actor signs a seasonal contract for nine months and is given a pay advance.

The jatra addicts know that the artistic standard of a company changes with the changes of actors.  Surya Dutta, the Director-Producer of the Natta Company helped to maintain a sound artistic standard year after year, and for this Surya Dutta's personal magnetism was responsible.  Some of the actors have been with him for thirty years, and that give the repertory a style and stability. Surya Dutta, affectionately called ‘Surya mama' by Makhan Lal Natta, was not only the guiding force behind Natta Company but also played the role of a mentor to many people associated with it including Makhan Lal Natta.

The selection of actors and actresses are the most important part in this profession. The actors and actresses are given more priority who had worked with reputed jatra groups. However, for newcomers and not so famous actors and actresses, their audition is taken. The ability of voice modulation and tone is given high priority. The overall appearance of the person also has a lot of importance. Apart from actors and actresses, there are many other people as the supporting team member. The supporting team looks after the stage setup, green room, transport, cooking etc. The actors and actresses are provided with facilities like – cars and separate hotel rooms.

The association of Natta Company and the Natta family cannot be separated. Makhan Natta who admits himself as a publicity adverse person, could have leveraged the Natta's legacy in jatra, through publicity and advertising. But the old man's eyes glitter with hope when he says – "It is just a slump. Jatra is an art, it shall never die".

References

External links 
 https://web.archive.org/web/20061115011102/http://www.yakshagana.com/re-apr02-1.htm JATRA (Folk Theatre Of India)
 
 http://www.indiaprofile.com/religion-culture/jatras.htm

Organisations based in West Bengal
Theatre companies in India
Organizations established in 1869
1869 establishments in India
Bengali theatre groups